Gomboc may refer to:

Mathematics
 Gömböc, a convex three-dimensional body that has one stable and one unstable point of equilibrium

People
 Andreja Gomboc (born 1969), Slovenian astrophysicist
 Adrian Gomboc (born 1995), Slovenian judoka 
 Ron Gomboc (born 1947), Slovenian-born Australian sculptor

Slovene-language surnames